Elise Mertens and Aryna Sabalenka defeated Ashleigh Barty and Victoria Azarenka in the final, 7–5, 7–5, to win the women's doubles tennis title at the 2019 US Open.

Barbora Strýcová retained the WTA no. 1 doubles ranking after the tournament. Kristina Mladenovic was also in contention for the top ranking at the start of the tournament.

Barty and CoCo Vandeweghe were the defending champions, but chose not to participate together. Barty played alongside Azarenka and lost in the final. Vandeweghe teamed up with Bethanie Mattek-Sands, but lost in the first round to Magda Linette and Iga Świątek.

Seeds

Draw

Finals

Top half

Section 1

Section 2

Bottom half

Section 3

Section 4

References

External links
2019 US Open – Women's draws and results at the International Tennis Federation

US Open (tennis) by year – Women's doubles
Women's Doubles
US Open - Women's Doubles
US Open - Women's Doubles